Chepelare is the principal town in Chepelare Municipality, part of Smolyan Province in Southern Bulgaria. It is situated in the central part of the Rhodopes, on the banks of Chepelare River. Chepelare is a popular winter resort with one of the longest ski runs in Southeastern Europe. It is located near Pamporovo, one of the biggest Bulgarian ski resorts. As of December 2009, the town has a population of 5,412 inhabitants.

The town is known for the only ski and snowboard factory in the Balkan peninsula. The factory cooperates with the ski brand Atomic Skis. Chepelare is also the birthplace of biathlete Ekaterina Dafovska, Bulgaria's only Winter Olympics gold medal winner. The local Sports School provides good conditions for young winter athletes.

Climate table:

The natural rocky phenomenon Marvelous Bridges is located near Chepelare.

Honour
Chepelare Peak on Livingston Island in the South Shetland Islands, Antarctica is named after Chepelare Town.

See also
Bogutevo, a village in Chepelare.

References

External links

Official 
 Tourism website of Chepelare: in English and Bulgarian
 Municipal website of Chepelare: in English and Bulgarian

Informational 
 Short information about Chepelare in German
 Information in English and Bulgarian 

Towns in Bulgaria
Cities and towns in the Rhodopes
Populated places in Smolyan Province
Ski areas and resorts in Bulgaria
Tourist attractions in Smolyan Province